Kimberley has released three studio albums and two singles. Kimberley signed a record deal with Sony Music Taiwan in 2010 and released her self-titled album Kimberley in 2012.

She then released her second studio album, entitled Kimbonomics in 2013. In 2014, she terminated the contract with Sony Music.At the same year, she signed a new contract with B.ANGEL.

In 2015, "You Are My Happiness" and "Do You Know That I Love You?" were released.

In 2017, she released her third studio album with Sharp Music, entitled "#Tag Me".

Studio albums

Singles

Other Appearance

Collaborations

Soundtrack Contributions

MV
Kimberley Chen's Official YouTube Channel
(https://m.youtube.com/user/itsKimberleyChen) was set up in 2012,all of her music videos would be uploaded to the channel.

References

Chen, Kimberley